The 2017 National Women's Soccer League season was the fifth season of the National Women's Soccer League, the top division of women's soccer in the United States. Including the NWSL's two professional predecessors, Women's Professional Soccer (2009–2011) and the Women's United Soccer Association (2001–2003), it was the eleventh overall season of FIFA- and USSF-sanctioned top-division women's soccer in the United States. The league is operated by the United States Soccer Federation and receives major financial backing from that body. Further financial backing is provided by the Canadian Soccer Association; both national federations pay the league salaries of many of their respective national team members in an effort to nurture talent in those nations.

The reigning champions Western New York Flash did not play under that name; the franchise was sold, relocated to Cary, North Carolina and rebranded as the North Carolina Courage.

After schedule disruptions in the previous two years caused by the 2015 FIFA Women's World Cup and the 2016 Summer Olympics, NWSL teams in 2017 once again played 24 games, a schedule last played during the 2014 season. The Courage won the NWSL Shield (the regular season), topping the Portland Thorns by two points.

The NWSL Playoff semifinals were held October 7–8, 2017, and were won by the Thorns and the Courage. The NWSL Championship Game was held on October 14, 2017 at Orlando City Stadium in Orlando, Florida. The Thorns won 1–0, becoming NWSL Champions, their second championship.

Teams, stadiums, and personnel

Stadiums and locations 

Two teams, the Dash and Reign, do not make their stadiums' entire capacity available for home games, instead restricting ticket sales at a lower level. The full capacities of their venues are included in parentheses and italics.

Personnel and sponsorship 

Note: All of the teams use Nike as their kit manufacturer.

Coaching changes

Competition format 

 Each team played a total of 24 games, 12 home and 12 away.
 The four teams at the end of the season with the most points qualified for the playoffs.

League standings

Tiebreakers 

The initial determining factor for a team's position in the standings is most points earned, with three points earned for a win, one point for a draw, and zero points for a loss. If two or more teams tie in point total, when determining rank and playoff qualification and seeding, the NWSL uses the following tiebreaker rules, going down the list until all teams are ranked.

 Head-to-head win–loss record between the teams (or points-per-game if more than two teams).
 Greater goal difference across the entire season (against all teams, not just tied teams).
 Greatest total number of goals scored (against all teams).
 Apply #1–3 to games played on the road.
 Apply #1–3 to games played at home.
 If teams are still equal, ranking will be determined by a coin toss.
NOTE: If two clubs remain tied after another club with the same number of points advances during any step, the tie breaker reverts to step 1 of the two-club format.

Weekly live standings 

Considering each week to end on a Sunday. 

Washington Spirit and Boston Breakers were eliminated from playoff contention in Week 18 on August 26, 2017 after losing their respective games. FC Kansas City and Houston Dash were both eliminated in Week 20 on September 9, after the Chicago Red Stars gained one more point in a tie against FC Kansas City. Sky Blue FC was eliminated later that weekend after a loss against the Washington Spirit. Seattle Reign was the last team to lose a playoff spot after a defeat in Week 21.

In Week 19, North Carolina Courage was the first team to clinch a playoff spot. Later that week, Portland Thorns clinched the second playoff spot. Both Chicago Red Stars and Orlando Pride clinched the remaining two spots in Week 21.

Attendance

Average home attendances

Ranked from highest to lowest average attendance.

Updated to games played on October 1, 2017.

Highest attendances 
Regular season

Updated to games played on October 7, 2017.

Statistical leaders

Top scorers

Updated: October 1, 2017

Top assists 

Updated: October 1, 2017

NWSL Playoffs 

The top four teams from the regular season competed for the NWSL Championship. In one semifinal, the North Carolina Courage defeated the Chicago Red Stars 1–0 on a dramatic 89th-minute goal. In the other, Portland Thorns FC defeated the Orlando Pride 4–1. One week later, in the final on October 14, Portland defeated North Carolina 1–0 to claim the NWSL Championship.

Semi-finals

Championship

Individual awards

Monthly awards

Player of the Month

Team of the Month

Weekly awards

Annual awards

References 

 NWSL Statistics

External links 

 
2017
National Women's Soccer League